The 2023 ACC Men's Challenger Cup was the inaugural edition of the ACC Men's Challenger Cup, hosted by Thailand in February and March of 2023. The tournament was part of the qualification pathway for the 2023 Asia Cup.

Eight teams took part in the tournament, among whom the top two  qualified for the 2023 ACC Men's Premier Cup. The Asian Cricket Council (ACC) announced the schedule of the tournament on 9 February 2023.

Bahrain and Saudi Arabia topped their respective groups before qualifying for the Men's Premier Cup by winning the two semi-final matches, with Saudi Arabia beating Bahrain in the final by 10 wickets.

Teams

Group stage

Group A

Points table

 Advanced to the knockout stage

Fixtures

Group B

Points table

 Advanced to the knockout stage

Fixtures

Knockout stage

Bracket

Semi-finals

1st semi-final

2nd semi-final

Final

References

Asia Cup
International cricket competitions in 2022–23
International cricket competitions in Thailand